Balandougouba is a border town in the Siguiri Prefecture in the Kankan Region of eastern Guinea.

References

Populated places in the Kankan Region